Popstar! Magazine is a worldwide released entertainment magazine featuring news stories on celebrities.

History
Popstar! Magazine is a nationally recognized entertainment magazine published in print and digital editions. It was founded by editor in chief Matthew Rettenmund and was first published on October 15, 1998, with the then-new boy band 98 Degrees on its inaugural cover. Popstar! was the first U.S. teen-entertainment title to be published in full color and on glossy paper throughout. In a September 1, 2004, article in Folio magazine, media critic Simon Dumenco wrote, "Popstar!, in short, created a new blueprint for the teen celebrity magazine market," arguing that its design and approach influenced Bonnie Fuller and the tidal wave of celebrity tabloids of the early 2000s. The magazine later expanded to include fashion and beauty elements, albeit with a very celebrity-oriented twist. As of 2011, Popstar! was the oldest continuously published teen-entertainment title in America. Popstar! is known for its interaction with readers via social media. Popstar has over 330 million views on YouTube, 2 million Facebook likes, and 445,000 Twitter followers. Popstar's former Editor-in-Chief Colleen Broomall often appeared on syndicated radio and television shows as a pop culture expert.

In 2017, POPSTAR! changed ownership to Popstar Publishing, Inc. 

Under the new ownership POPSTAR! provides print and digital magazines, streaming 24/7 radio, TV programs, and a website that offers high end original dramas and comedies all available through POPSTAR's website.  In May 2020 POPSTAR! original programming on the POPSTAR! Network was nominated for 2 Daytime Emmy Awards. POPSTAR! network of streaming media is available on top platforms such as Roku, Fire TV, Apple TV, STIRR. As of May 2020, POPSTAR! produces a free digitally interactive magazine. 

POPSTAR! has been a media partner with the Hollywood Christmas Parade since 2017.

Elizabeth Stanton serves as "Official Spokesperson" for the POPSTAR! Network.

Circulation
An annual survey in 2007 by Experian Simmons Research of Fort Lauderdale, Florida found that Popstar! Magazine'' tied Nickelodeon Magazine among American girls 8 to 14 for familiarity, with nearly one in three girls in that age group surveyed saying they had read or looked at the magazine.  Circulation was 270,148 as of December 2008.

References

External links
Popstar!

Celebrity magazines published in the United States
Entertainment magazines published in the United States
Magazines established in 1998
Magazines published in Nevada
Mass media in Las Vegas
Monthly magazines published in the United States
Teen magazines